Fyodorovka (Fyodorovka) is a rural locality (a selo) and the administrative center of Fyodorovsky District in the Republic of Bashkortostan, Russia. Population:

References

Notes

Sources

Rural localities in Fyodorovsky District